Sofiane Boutebba (born 17 February 1989) is an Algerian footballer who plays as a defender for USM Annaba in the Algerian Ligue Professionnelle 2.

References

External links

Sofiane Boutebba at Footballdatabase

1989 births
Living people
Association football defenders
Algerian footballers
DRB Tadjenanet players
21st-century Algerian people